Harmon Theodore Ogdahl, Sr. (November 18, 1917 – November 8, 2009) was an American businessman and politician.

Ogdahl was born in Minneapolis, Minnesota and graduated from Washburn High School in Minneapolis. He went to Hamline University and University of Minnesota. Ogdahl served in the United States Army during World War II and was stationed in the Pacific. Ogdahl lived with his wife and family in Minneapolis. He was involved with the real estate, banking, and insurance businesses. Ogdahl served on the Minneapolis City Council and was a Republican. he served in the Minnesota Senate from 1963 to 1980. In 1968 he ran  for election to the United States House of Representatives and lost the election. He died in Miineapolis, Minnesota.

Notes

1917 births
2009 deaths
Businesspeople from Minneapolis
Politicians from Minneapolis
Military personnel from Minneapolis
Hamline University alumni
University of Minnesota alumni
Republican Party Minnesota state senators
United States Army personnel of World War II